There's No Gettin' Over Me is the thirteenth studio album by American country music artist Ronnie Milsap, released in 1981 by RCA Records. The album produced two No. 1 hits for Milsap, including the title track, which also peaked at No. 2 on the Adult Contemporary chart and No. 5 on the Billboard Hot 100. "I Wouldn't Have Missed It For the World," the other #1 single, also reached No. 20 and No. 3 on the Billboard Hot 100 and Adult Contemporary charts, respectively.

There's No Gettin' Over Me reached No. 1 on Country album charts and broke the Top 40 of the Billboard 200, peaking at No. 31. It was ultimately certified as Gold. Allmusic described the album as the "perfect example of what Milsap was about in his middle period. There's humility in his confidence and a genuine empathy in his croon. Yeah, it's slick, and even schlocky in places...but it's also terrific." The publication focused on the track "I Wouldn't Have Missed It For the World," which it describes as "urban cowboy country music in its purest essence"

Track listing

Personnel
Acoustic Guitar: Jimmy Capps, Jack Watkins
Bass guitar: Warren Gowers
Drums: Buster Phillips
Electric Guitar: Pete Bordonali, Bruce Dees, Brent Rowan, Jack Watkins
Electric Piano: David Briggs
Harmonica: Charlie McCoy
Harp: Cindy Reynolds-Wyatt
Organ: Bobby Wood
Piano: Ronnie Milsap
Saxophone: Ronald Eades
Steel Guitar: Sonny Garrish, John Hughey
Strings: Sheldon Kurland Strings
Synthesizer: Shane Keister, Ronnie Milsap, Richard Ripani
Vibraphone: Charlie McCoy
String Arranger: D. Bergen White

Charts

Album

Singles

References

1981 albums
Ronnie Milsap albums
RCA Records albums
Albums produced by Tom Collins (record producer)